Nakagawa Kenzō (中川 健藏, 16 July 1875 – 26 June 1944) was a Japanese bureaucrat and political figure.

After graduating from Tokyo Imperial University in 1902, he passed the civil service examination and was posted to the Hokkaido regional administration. Over the next few years he rotated through positions in the Cabinet Legislation Bureau, government survivors' benefits bureau, development bureau and postal ministry. He became a director of the South Manchuria Railway in 1919.

From 1923 to 1929 he served in regional leadership roles as the governor of Kagawa Prefecture (1923–1924), governor Kumamoto Prefecture (1924–1925), Director of the Hokkaido Agency (1925–1927) and governor of Tokyo (July–October 1929). In 1930 he was appointed as vice-minister of education in the cabinet of Prime Minister Hamaguchi Osachi.

He served as the 16th Governor-General of Taiwan from 1932 to 1936 and presided over the Taiwanese exposition (台湾博覧会) of 1935. Nakagawa implemented limited self-rule in Taiwan by allowing Taiwanese and Japanese residents to vote for half of the membership of local assemblies, although these assemblies were still subject to extensive control by the governor-general.

In 1936, Nakagawa returned to Japan as a member of the House of Peers. In 1939 he was appointed president of Imperial Japanese Airways, the state-run airline of the Japanese Empire. He remained a member of the House of Peers and the head of the airline until his death in 1944.

References

1875 births
1944 deaths
People from Niigata Prefecture
Governors of Kagawa Prefecture
Governors of Kumamoto Prefecture
Directors of the Hokkaido Agency
Governors of Tokyo
Governors-General of Taiwan